Glyn Jones may refer to:
Glyn Jones (figure skater) (born 1953), British figure skater at the 1976 Winter Olympics
Glyn Jones (footballer, born 1936), English footballer
Glyn Jones (footballer, born 1959), Welsh footballer
Glyn Jones (rugby league), rugby league footballer of the 1940s for Wales, and Broughton Rangers
Glyn Jones (South African writer) (1931–2014), South African writer and actor
Glyn Jones (Welsh writer) (1905–1995), Welsh writer
Glyn Smallwood Jones (1908–1992), British colonial administrator

See also 
Glyn Johns